Mablethorpe and Sutton is a civil parish and town in East Lindsey, Lincolnshire, England.  It is on the North Sea coast and includes Mablethorpe, Trusthorpe, Sutton-on-Sea and Sandilands along with the inland village of Thorpe.  According to the 2001 census it had a population of 11,780, increasing to 12,531 at the 2011 Census.

In 1894 the Civil Parish of Mablethorpe was included in Louth Rural District but in 1896 was created as an urban district in Lincolnshire, Parts of Lindsey.  In 1925 it was joined in the urban district by the parishes of Sutton in the Marsh and Trusthope, from Spilsby Rural District and Louth Rural District respectively, and therefore changed its name.

Its urban district status was abolished by the Local Government Act 1972 in 1974, with the district authority becoming East Lindsey, whilst Mablethorpe and Sutton remained a civil parish with a town council.

Freedom of the Parish
The following people and military units have received the Freedom of the Parish of Mablethorpe and Sutton.

Individuals
 Jack Quinn: 9 November 2019.

Military Units

Arms

See also 

 Alford and Sutton Tramway

References

External links
Mablethorpe and Sutton Town Council

Populated places in Lincolnshire
Civil parishes in Lincolnshire
East Lindsey District
Mablethorpe